ACJA may be an abbreviation for:

Organizations 
 All-China Journalists Association
 Atlantic City Jitney Association
 American Criminal Justice Association